El-Said Hamdy graduated from the Military College on Feb. 1948. Served in an Artillery regiment in the 1948 War. Commanded a Self-Propelled Artillery battery in the Suez War. Commander of the Air Defence Forces from Dec.1979 to Jan.1986.

Major Activities:

Diversification of sources of Air Defence weapons and augmenting the following stern missiles and Radar equipment: Hawk, Amoun missiles systems, TPS 59, TPS 63 radar systems to the Air Defence forces.
Starting the studies of applying command control and communication system to the Air defence forces.
Participated in the following wars:

 Tripartite Aggression
 Six Day War
 Yom Kippur War

References

Egyptian generals
1928 births
Living people